Filippo Marchetti (26 February 1831, Bolognola, Macerata – 18 January 1902, Rome) was an Italian opera composer.  After studying in Naples, his first opera was "successfully premiered" in Turin in 1856. With only limited success, he became a teacher of singing and composition in Rome before composing Romeo e Giulietta for a premiere in Trieste in 1865.

Overshadowed like other Italian opera composers of his period by the genius of Verdi, Marchetti achieved one great success with his 1869 opera - Ruy Blas - which was based on Victor Hugo's play, Ruy Blas. It has been noted that "it was one of the first Italian operas to show the influence of French grand opera, partly, no doubt in response to its French source". The opera was performed into the 20th Century.

Major works

 Gentile da Varano, February 1856, Turin
 La demente, 27 November 1856, Turin
 Il paria, 1859
 Romeo e Giulietta, 25 October 1865, Trieste; revised 1872 and 1876. 
 Ruy Blas, 3 April 1869, Milan.  
 Gustavo Wasa, 7 February 1875, Milan.
 Don Giovanni d'Austria, 11 March 1880, Turin

Recordings

 Romeo e Giulietta. With Daolio, Portoghese, Coletta, Cassi, and Dolari. Cond:  Yurkevych. Audio CD: Dynamic, Cat: CDS 501/1-2.
Ruy Blas with Theodossiou, Marini, Malagnini, Gazale, Moncini. Cond: Lipton. Audio CD:  Bongiovanni, Cat: GB 2237/38-2.

References
Notes

Sources
Holden, Amanda (Ed.), The New Penguin Opera Guide, New York: Penguin Putnam, 2001. 
Nicolaisen, Jay, Italian Opera in Transition, 1871-1893, UMI Research Press, 1980

External links
 
 

1831 births
1902 deaths
Italian classical composers
Italian male classical composers
Italian opera composers
Male opera composers
People from the Province of Macerata
19th-century Italian musicians
19th-century Italian male musicians